Dustin may refer to:

Places in the United States
 Dustin, Nebraska
 Dustin Township, Holt County, Nebraska
 Dustin, Oklahoma

Other uses
 Dustin (name), including a list of people and fictional characters with the given name or surname
 Dustin AB, Swedish electronics store
 Dustin (comic strip), a syndicated comic strip by Steve Kelley and Jeff Parker
 Dustin (film), a 2020 short drama film by Naïla Guiguet

See also
Dusting (disambiguation)